The 2013–14 Bermudian Premier Division is the 51st season of the highest competitive football league in Bermuda, which was founded in 1963.

Overview
The competition started in September 2013 and finished in March 2014. Devonshire Cougars were the defending champions, having won their fourth league championship the season before.

Dandy Town Hornets won the league title in March 2014 after beating Devonshire Cougars, with North Village Rams losing their match against already-relegated Wolves.

St. David's Warriors and Wolves were relegated, with both teams still hoping to stay up come the final day of the competition.

Teams

League  table

Top scorers

References

Bermudian Premier Division seasons
Bermuda
1